Zvíkov may refer to places in the South Bohemian Region of the Czech Republic:

Zvíkov (České Budějovice District), a municipality and village
Zvíkov (Český Krumlov District), a municipality and village
Zvíkov Castle, a castle in Zvíkovské Podhradí municipality

See also
Zvíkovec
Zvíkovské Podhradí